The Meskwaki Settlement is an unincorporated community in Tama County, Iowa, United States, west of Tama. It encompasses the reservation lands of the Meskwaki Nation (federally recognized as the Sac and Fox Tribe of the Mississippi in Iowa), one of three Sac and Fox tribes in the United States. The others are located in Oklahoma and Kansas. The settlement is located in the historic territory of the Meskwaki (Fox), an Algonquian people. Meskwaki people established the settlement in 1857 by privately repurchasing a small part of the land they had lost in the Sac and Fox treaty of 1842.

Government
The Nation operates a tribal school, tribal courts, public works department, and police force. As of 2009, there were about 1,300 members of this Meskwaki Tribe, of whom about 800 live on the settlement; non-tribal members, including spouses, also live on the settlement.

The Meskwaki Casino Resort is located on the settlement and generates revenue for the welfare of the tribe. The tribe holds a large pow-wow at the settlement each year.

Legislation in 2018 restored the Meskwaki Nation's legal jurisdiction over tribal members within the settlement boundaries. The state of Iowa continues to exercise jurisdiction over pre-2018 legal cases and non-tribal citizens on tribal land.

History
The Meskwaki traded with French colonists of the Illinois Country but were forced west by competition in the 18th-century fur trade and later United States development pressures. In the early decades of the 19th century, the Meskwaki and Sac were being forced to cede land in Iowa and nearby areas to the United States and to move west of the Missouri River, culminating in the Sac and Fox treaty of 1842. Some Meskwaki people resisted Indian removal, but they were initially unable to buy property because they were not considered citizens under Iowa law. In 1856, the Iowa state legislature passed a law permitting the Meskwaki to reside in Tama County, and Meskwaki people began to purchase land in 1857 with the state governor acting as a legal trustee. Over the following 150 years, the Meskwaki gradually expanded the settlement by purchasing nearby lands. The lands entered into federal trust in 1896. As the settlement was never formally incorporated as a city it has no official name, and was commonly called "Indian Town" or “Indian Village” into the 20th century. The anthropologist Duren Ward suggested the settlement be named "Meskwakia," but this name never caught on. The total lands owned by the tribe is called "Meskwakenuk" by the Meskwaki tribal government. In the 21st century, there are two other federally recognized Sac and Fox tribes, who have independent reservations and governments in present-day states of Kansas, Oklahoma and Nebraska.

Geography
The settlement did not begin as an Indian reservation in the traditional sense, because it was privately purchased by Meskwaki people rather than being reserved by treaty or federal legislation. However, a portion of the area gained federal reservation status after 1896. According to the United States Census Bureau,  of the Meskwaki Settlement had legal reservation status in 2020, and an additional  were off-reservation trust land.

Demographics
As of the census of 2020, the population of Meskwaki Settlement (including both reservation and off-reservation trust land) was 1,142. The racial makeup of the settlement was 85.9% Native American, 2.9% White, 0.3% Asian, 0.2% Black or African American, 0.3% from other races, and 10.5% from two or more races. Ethnically, the population was 8.8% Hispanic or Latino of any race.

Education
The community is within the South Tama County Community School District.

There is also the Sac and Fox Tribe-operated Meskwaki Settlement School (MSS), a PK-12 school. It was formed in 1938 as a merger of two Native American day schools. Typically settlement students attend the tribal school or South Tama County High School.

Notable Meskwaki
Ray Young Bear, writer

References

Sac and Fox
Unincorporated communities in Tama County, Iowa
Unincorporated communities in Iowa
Algonquian peoples
1857 establishments in Iowa
Populated places established in 1857